Holmium(III) bromide is a crystalline compound made of one holmium atom and three bromine atoms. Holmium bromide is a yellow powder at room temperature. Holmium bromide is hygroscopic. Holmium bromide is odorless.

Reactions
Holmium(III) bromide is formed as a result of the reaction:

2 Ho(s) + 3 Br2(g) → 2 HoBr3(s)

Holmium(III) bromide reacts with strong oxidising agents. When involved in a fire, holmium bromide may release hydrogen bromide, and metal oxide fumes.

References

Bromides
Holmium compounds
Lanthanide halides